Carlo Dell'Omodarme (born 11 February 1938 in La Spezia) is a retired Italian professional footballer who played as a midfielder.

Career
Throughout his career, Dell'Omodarme played for Italian clubs Juventus, Parma, Como, and SPAL, before retiring with the Rochester Lancers in the American Soccer League. Despite his talent, he experienced mixed success during his two spells with Juventus, winning the Coppa Italia in 1965, but also undergoing criticism due to his inconsistency and individualistic playing style.

Style of play
A skilful winger, Dell'Omodarme was known in particular for his excellent dribbling skills as a footballer, although he was also criticised for being selfish and for his work-rate.

Honours
Juventus
 Coppa Italia winner: 1964–65.

References

1938 births
Living people
Italian footballers
Italian expatriate footballers
Serie A players
Serie B players
North American Soccer League (1968–1984) players
Juventus F.C. players
Parma Calcio 1913 players
Como 1907 players
S.P.A.L. players
Rochester New York FC players
Expatriate soccer players in the United States
Association football midfielders